Slunečná (until 1949 Sonneberk) is a municipality and village in Česká Lípa District in the Liberec Region of the Czech Republic. It has about 100 inhabitants.

History
The first written mention of Slunečná is from 1597.

References

External links

Villages in Česká Lípa District